Tukumach'ay or Tuku Mach'ay (Quechua tuku owl, t'uqu a niche in the wall, mach'ay a cave / a niche in the wall, Hispanicized spelling Tucumachay) is a mountain in the Paryaqaqa or Waruchiri mountain range in the Andes of Peru, about  high. It is situated in the Junín Region, Jauja Province, Canchayllo District. Tukumach'ay lies north-east of the Paryaqaqa, between the mountain Tunshu in the northwest and the lake Qarwaqucha in the southeast.

References

Mountains of Peru
Mountains of Junín Region